Jalpaite is a rare copper silver sulfide mineral with formula Ag3CuS2.

It was first described in 1858 for an occurrence in the Leonora Mine, Jalpa, Zacatecas, Mexico and named for the locality. Associated minerals include acanthite, mckinstryite, galena, sphalerite, pyrite, chalcopyrite, stromeyerite, polybasite, pearceite, tetrahedrite–tennantite and native silver.

References

Sulfide minerals
Copper(I) minerals
Silver minerals
Tetragonal minerals
Minerals in space group 141